Norge Blay (born 21 May 1967) is a Cuban water polo player. He competed in the men's tournament at the 1992 Summer Olympics.

References

1967 births
Living people
Cuban male water polo players
Olympic water polo players of Cuba
Water polo players at the 1992 Summer Olympics
Place of birth missing (living people)